Jeff Black may refer to:

Jeff Black (singer-songwriter) (born 1960), American singer-songwriter
Jeff Black (businessman) (born 1962), American chief executive officer
Jeffrey Black (born 1962), Australian opera singer